Annie Niviaxie (1930–1989) was an Inuit artist known for her stone sculptures, but also worked with other materials like grass and animal skins. She initially learned her skills in sculpture from other artists in her community.  Niviaxie was born in the area of Inukjuak, Quebec, and died in Kuujjuaraapik.

Her work is included in the collections of the National Gallery of Canada, the Winnipeg Art Gallery, and the National Museum of the American Indian part of the Smithsonian Institute.

References

1930 births
1989 deaths
20th-century Canadian sculptors
20th-century Canadian women artists
Inuit artists
Canadian women sculptors
Artists from Quebec
Inuit from Quebec
People from Nunavik